Alucita caucasica is a moth of the family Alucitidae. It is found in the Caucasus.

References

Moths described in 1986
Alucitidae
Moths of Europe
Moths of Asia